Épenède is a commune in the Charente department in southwestern France.

Épenède, of which the Latin spina would mean thorn shrub, is bordered to the north by the department of Vienne and to the southwest by the valley of the river Transon. The village is situated on the dividing line of the waters of the Charente and the Vienne. The  parish of Épenède was a dependant of the vast domains of the Benedictine abbey at nearby Charroux and in the diocese of Poitiers.

Population

Sights
The Holy Church of St. Hilaire is 12th century and is of Limousin style (except the steeple bell tower which is more recent).  This structure was burned at the time of the Wars of Religion.  The capitals of the four spans of the nave are ancient, and one of them represents a monster holding in its claws a human head that it is about to devour.  Many water sources or fountains "miraculous" sprinkle the commune.

See also
Communes of the Charente department

References

Communes of Charente